Consolata Kabonesa is an Ugandan gender activist with a specialised experience  in the women and gender programming, gender training, project and research within the decentralized system. She is also an Assoc. Prof at the School of Women and Gender Studies, Makerere University.

Background and education

Career

Academic experience 
In 1984, Consolata worked as a student teacher at Pearse Vocational College in Dublin, Ireland. She then became a part-time lecturer for Literary Criticism in the department of literature at Makerere University between 1989 and 1991.

In 1992, she worked as a research assistant at The Nation of Tomorrow Project, which was funded by Kellogg Foundation, University of Illinois at Urbana-Champaign shortened as UIUC for two years. She then continued as a teaching assistant under department of Human and Community Development, UIUC between 1991 and 1997.

In 1997, she became a graduate assistant for U of I Afro-American studies and research program, UIUC. She started lecturing at Makerere University in 1999 under the department of women and gender studies, later on in 2007, she was a research affiliate at Health Leisure and Human Performance Research Institute, Faculty of Kinesiology and Recreation Management, University of Manitoba, Canada.

In 2007, she also became a senior lecturer at the School of Women and Gender Studies, Makerere University to present.

Administrative experience

Awards 
Consolata won the Meritorious award and Cash Award, American Embassy, Uganda in 1988 and 1990 respectively. She again in 1993 won the John W. Price, International Understanding Award, UIUC and in 2005, she was nominated and won the Outstanding Lecturer award, at the Faculty of Social science, Makerere University.

She won The Role Model Diva Awards in 2011 and went straight to win two more in 2012 and 2013 respectively.

References

External links 
 Website of Makerere University School of Women and Gender Studies

Makerere University alumni
Academic staff of Makerere University
Living people

Year of birth missing (living people)
Ugandan human rights activists
Stonehill College alumni
University of Illinois Urbana-Champaign alumni
Gender studies academics